Sarita Lake is a lake located on Vancouver Island an expansion of Sarita River and east of Numukamis Bay, Barkley Sound.

See also
List of lakes of British Columbia

References

Alberni Valley
Lakes of Vancouver Island
Barclay Land District